Proper equilibrium is a refinement of Nash Equilibrium by Roger B. Myerson. 
Proper equilibrium further refines Reinhard Selten's notion of a 
trembling hand perfect equilibrium by assuming that more costly trembles are made with 
significantly smaller probability than less
costly ones.

Definition

Given a normal form game and a parameter , a totally mixed strategy profile   is defined to be -proper if, whenever a player has two pure strategies s and s' such that the expected payoff of playing s is smaller than the expected payoff of 
playing s' (that is ), then the probability assigned to s
is at most  times the probability assigned to s'.

The strategy profile of the game is said to be a proper equilibrium
if it is a limit point, as  approaches 0, of a sequence of -proper strategy profiles.

Example 

The game to the right is a variant of Matching Pennies. 

Player 1 (row player) hides a 
penny and if Player 2 (column player) guesses correctly whether it is heads up or tails up, he gets the penny. In
this variant, Player 2 has a third option: Grabbing the penny without guessing.
The Nash equilibria of the game are the strategy profiles where Player 2 grabs the penny
with probability 1. Any mixed strategy of Player 1 is in (Nash) equilibrium with this pure strategy
of Player 2. Any such pair is even trembling hand perfect.
Intuitively, since Player 1 expects Player 2 to grab the penny, he is not concerned about
leaving Player 2 uncertain about whether it is heads up or tails up. However, it can be seen
that the unique proper equilibrium of this game is the one where Player 1 hides the penny heads up with probability 1/2 and tails up with probability 1/2 (and Player 2 grabs the penny).  
This unique proper equilibrium can be motivated 
intuitively as follows: Player 1 fully expects Player 2 to grab the penny.
However, Player 1 still prepares for the unlikely event that Player 2 does not grab the
penny and instead for some reason decides to make a guess. Player 1 prepares for this event by
making sure that Player 2 has no information about whether the penny is heads up or tails up,
exactly as in the original Matching Pennies game.

Proper equilibria of extensive games 

One may apply the properness notion to extensive form games in two different ways, completely analogous to the 
two different ways trembling hand perfection
is applied to extensive games. This leads to the notions of normal form proper equilibrium
and extensive form proper equilibrium of an extensive form game. It was shown by van
Damme that a normal form proper equilibrium of an extensive form game is behaviorally equivalent to
a quasi-perfect equilibrium of that game.

References 
 Roger B. Myerson. Refinements of the Nash equilibrium concept. International Journal of Game Theory, 15:133-154, 1978.
 Eric van Damme. "A relationship between perfect equilibria in extensive form games and proper equilibria in normal form games." International Journal of Game Theory 13:1--13, 1984.
 

Game theory equilibrium concepts
Non-cooperative games